Boško Balaban (born 15 October 1978) is a Croatian former footballer who played as a striker. Balaban also played for the Croatia national team.

Club career

Early career
Born in Rijeka, he started playing for local club HNK Rijeka and appeared in 97 matches between 1995 and 2000, scoring a total of 21 goals. During the 1999–2000 season, he was the top scorer of his team with 15 goals and attracted the attention of another Croatian club, Dinamo Zagreb. Playing for Dinamo, Balaban kept up his goalscoring form and once again became the league's top scorer with 14 goals in 25 games. Two games into the following season, he was signed by Aston Villa for a fee of £5.8 million, earning a £20,000-a-week contract.

Aston Villa
Balaban failed to find any form for Aston Villa, making just nine appearances, seven as a substitute, in two and a half years. He was loaned back to Dinamo Zagreb for the 2002–03 season, scoring 15 times in 24 appearances. In December 2003, Aston Villa released Balaban from his contract and he signed for Club Brugge on a free transfer.

Balaban is regularly cited as one of the worst Premier League signings of all time. In a 2019 interview with FourFourTwo, Balaban disputed this, arguing that Aston Villa never gave him an opportunity to play: "If you’re a club that throws big money at signings and then doesn’t let them actually play, the jokes should really be at your expense."

Club Brugge
In the 2004–05 season, Balaban scored 25 goals in 24 appearances for Club Brugge; in the 2005–06 season, he scored 27 goals in 30 games for Brugge. In August 2007, Balaban went back to Dinamo after Brugge had bought the top scorer François Sterchele. Balaban stated he would miss Brugge very much and he had a wonderful time at the club. He earned the nickname amongst Brugge fans of "Super Bosko", due to him scoring four times in one match and scoring at an average of 0.5 goals per match.

Dinamo Zagreb
During Balaban's time at Dinamo Zagreb, he had an incident with fascist salute, which he made to fans after scoring a goal against Inter Zapresic. He had to pay a fine of 100KN (around €14).

Panionios
In June 2009, Panionios signed Balaban on a three-year contract. Balaban scored eight goals and he was Panionios' first scorer for the Super League 2009–10.

Selangor FA
On 29 January 2012, Malaysian Super League team Selangor FA signed Balaban for an undisclosed fee. He debuted, and scored the winning goal in the game against league leaders Kelantan FA on 14 February 2012, Selangor winning 2–1.

After helping Selangor to qualify for the 2013 AFC Cup, Balaban's contract was not extended after a mutual agreement.

International career
Balaban won 35 international caps for Croatia between 2000 and 2007, scoring ten goals. His debut came in a friendly match against Slovakia on 16 August 2000, after being a regular member of the Croatian under-21 team for more than a year. His debut proved successful, as he scored Croatia's only goal in a 1-1 draw.

Balaban excelled during Croatia's qualifying campaign for the 2002 FIFA World Cup, appearing in all eight matches and scored five goals, including a hat-trick against Latvia in a 4–1 victory on 24 March 2001. He was also in the Croatia squad at the final 2002 World Cup tournament, but spent all three group matches on the bench. He subsequently did not appear in any matches for Croatia between February 2003 and August 2004, missing the entire Euro 2004 qualifying campaign as well as the final tournament. He made his competitive comeback against Bulgaria on 9 October 2004 in the Croatia team's qualifying campaign for the 2006 FIFA World Cup and subsequently appeared in another four qualifying matches, scoring a brace against Iceland on 3 September 2005. He was also a squad member at the 2006 World Cup finals, but once again spent all three group matches on the bench.

In early September 2006, Croatia manager Slaven Bilić dropped Balaban, along with teammates Ivica Olić and Dario Srna, from the squad for their opening Euro 2008 qualifier against Russia because of a late-night party in a Zagreb disco. However, Balaban was the only one of the three players to return to the squad for the very next qualifier against Andorra one month later, which Croatia won 7-0. Coming on as a substitute an hour into the match, and with Croatia 5–0 up, Balaban subsequently scored the fastest-ever goal by a single player for the Croatia national team, scoring just 20 seconds after coming onto the pitch.

Career statistics

Club
Source:

International appearances
Source:

International goals

Honours
Dinamo Zagreb
Prva HNL: 2002–03, 2007–08
Croatian Cup: 2000–01, 2007–08, 2008–09
Croatian Super Cup: 2002

Club Brugge
Belgian First Division: 2004–05
Belgian Cup: 2003–04, 2006–07
Belgian Supercup: 2005

Individual
SN Yellow Shirt award: 2001
Fastest goal scored for Croatia
Malaysian League top goalscorer: 2012

References

External links

1978 births
Living people
Footballers from Rijeka
Association football forwards
Croatian footballers
Croatia under-21 international footballers
Croatia international footballers
2002 FIFA World Cup players
2006 FIFA World Cup players
HNK Rijeka players
GNK Dinamo Zagreb players
Aston Villa F.C. players
Club Brugge KV players
Panionios F.C. players
Selangor FA players
Croatian Football League players
Premier League players
Belgian Pro League players
Super League Greece players
Malaysia Super League players
Croatian expatriate footballers
Expatriate footballers in Greece
Croatian expatriate sportspeople in Greece
Expatriate footballers in England
Croatian expatriate sportspeople in England
Expatriate footballers in Belgium
Croatian expatriate sportspeople in Belgium
Expatriate footballers in Malaysia
Croatian expatriate sportspeople in Malaysia